Antonis Constantinides (born 24 October 1974) is a Cypriot professional basketball head coach, currently head coach of BC Körmend of the Hungarian league. He won both the Cypriot championship and cup titles in 2011 with ETHA Engomis, his first ever career titles, after which he was chosen 'coach of the year' for the 2010-11 season in Cyprus. He has experience in European competitions, participating regularly with his teams in the FIBA EuroChallenge.

Personal life
Constantinides is a fluent speaker of English and Greek language.

References

1974 births
Living people
BC Körmend coaches
Cypriot basketball coaches
Basketball
People from Nicosia